Michaela Pavlíčková (born 27 November 1977 in Prague) is a Czech former basketball player who competed in the 2004 Summer Olympics. A forward, she attended the University of Denver where she played for its women's basketball team, coming from her last secondary year at Boulder High School in Boulder, Colorado, after moving from Prague. Pavlíčková was drafted in the second round of the 2001 WNBA draft by the Utah Starzz, playing 18 games in two separate seasons for the Starzz and the Phoenix Mercury. After her WNBA stint was over, she moved back to Europe to finish her professional career.

References

1977 births
Living people
Basketball players at the 2004 Summer Olympics
Czech expatriate basketball people in the United States
Czech women's basketball players
College women's basketball players in the United States
Forwards (basketball)
Olympic basketball players of the Czech Republic
Phoenix Mercury players
University of Denver alumni
Utah Starzz draft picks
Utah Starzz players
Sportspeople from Prague